This is a list of schools in the London Borough of Merton, England.

State-funded schools

Primary schools

Abbotsbury Primary School
All Saints' CE Primary School
Aragon Primary School
Beecholme Primary School
Benedict Academy
Bishop Gilpin CE Primary School
Bond Primary School
Cranmer Primary School
Dundonald Primary School
Garfield Primary School
Gorringe Park Primary School
Harris Primary Academy Merton
Haslemere Primary School
Hatfeild Primary School
Hillcross Primary School
Hollymount School
Holy Trinity CE Primary School
Joseph Hood Primary School
Liberty Primary School
Links Primary School
Lonesome Primary School
Malmesbury Primary School
Merton Abbey Primary School
Merton Park Primary School
Morden Primary School
Park Academy
Pelham Primary School
Poplar Primary School
The Priory CE School
Sacred Heart RC Primary School
St John Fisher RC Primary School
St Mark's Primary School
St Mary's RC Primary School
St Matthew's CE Primary School
SS Peter and Paul RC Primary School
St Teresa's RC Primary School
St Thomas of Canterbury RC Primary School
The Sherwood School
Singlegate Primary School
Stanford Primary School
West Wimbledon Primary School
William Morris Primary School
Wimbledon Chase Primary School
Wimbledon Park Primary School

Secondary schools

Harris Academy Merton	
Harris Academy Morden
Harris Academy Wimbledon
Raynes Park High School
Ricards Lodge High School
Rutlish School 	
St Mark's Academy 	
Ursuline High School
Wimbledon College

Special and alternative schools
Canterbury Campus
Cricket Green School
Melrose School
Perseid School

Further education
South Thames College

Independent schools

Primary and preparatory schools

 Date Valley School
 Donhead Preparatory School
 The London Acorn School
 The Rowans School
 The Study Preparatory School
 Ursuline Preparatory School
 Willington School
 Wimbledon Common Preparatory School

Senior and all-through schools
Hall School Wimbledon
King's College School
The Norwegian School in London
Wimbledon High School

Special and alternative schools
Blossom House School
Eagle House School
Jus'T'Learn
RISE Education

External links
Schools Directory - Merton Council

Merton
Schools in the London Borough of Merton